Paul Stanley Jones (born 10 September 1953) is an English former professional footballer who played in the Football League for Mansfield Town.

References

1953 births
Living people
English footballers
Association football midfielders
English Football League players
Manchester United F.C. players
Rochdale A.F.C. players
Mansfield Town F.C. players
Chesterfield F.C. players